

Plants

Conifers

Angiosperms

Arthropods

Insects

Molluscs

Bivalves

Fishes

Newly named bony fishes

Archosauromorphs
 Aff. Rebbachisaurus gastroliths documented.
 The "Talkeetna Mountains Hadrosaur" specimen was discovered  in a quarry being excavated for road material. The quarry is near the Glenn Highway, approximately 150 miles northeast of Anchorage. That fall, excavation began, and was resumed in the summer of 1996.

Newly named pseudosuchians

Newly named basal dinosauromorphs

Newly named dinosaurs
Data courtesy of George Olshevsky's dinosaur genera list.

Birds

Plesiosaurs
 Plesiosaur gastroliths documented.

New taxa

Pterosaurs

New taxa

Other diapsids

New taxa

Footnotes

References
 Calvo, J.O. (1994). Gastroliths in sauropod dinosaurs. Gaia, 10: 205–208.
 Martin, James E.; 1994; Gastric residues in marine reptiles from the Late Cretaceous Pierre Shale in South Dakota; their bearing on extinction; Journal of Vertebrate Paleontology; 14(3, Suppl.) pp. 36; University of Oklahoma
 Pasch, A. D., K. C. May. 2001. Taphonomy and paleoenvironment of hadrosaur (Dinosauria) from the Matanuska Formation (Turonian) in South-Central Alaska. In: Mesozoic Vertebrate Life. Ed.s Tanke, D. H., Carpenter, K., Skrepnick, M. W. Indiana University Press. Pages 219–236.
 Sanders F, Manley K, Carpenter K. Gastroliths from the Lower Cretaceous sauropod Cedarosaurus weiskopfae. In: Tanke D.H, Carpenter K, editors. Mesozoic vertebrate life: new research inspired by the paleontology of Philip J. Currie. Indiana University Press; Bloomington, IN: 2001. pp. 166–180.

 
1990s in paleontology
Paleontology